A by-election was held for the New South Wales Legislative Assembly seat of Lake Macquarie on 19 April 1969. It was triggered by the death of Jim Simpson.

Dates

Results 

				

Jim Simpson died.

See also
Electoral results for the district of Lake Macquarie
List of New South Wales state by-elections

References 

1969 elections in Australia
New South Wales state by-elections
1960s in New South Wales
April 1969 events in Australia